90059 is the second studio album by American rapper Jay Rock. It was released on September 11, 2015 on Apple Music and the iTunes Store; the physical editions were released on September 18, 2015 by Top Dawg Entertainment (TDE). The album features guest appearances from Rock's TDE label-mates Kendrick Lamar, Black Hippy, Isaiah Rashad, SZA, SiR and introduces Lance Skiiiwalker, Chicago singer-producer who in 2016 would be named as a new TDE signee as well as Busta Rhymes and Macy Gray.

The album, which takes its title from Jay Rock's hometown ZIP Code, was supported by three singles, "Money Trees Deuce", "Gumbo" and the title-track "90059". The album debuted at number 16 on the US Billboard 200 chart, selling 19,000 album-equivalent units copies in its first week. Upon its release, 90059 received critical acclaim from music critics.

Background
In September 2014, Tech N9ne revealed that Jay Rock had left Strange Music, thus leaving him solely under Top Dawg Entertainment (TDE). In March 2015, TDE founder Anthony Tiffith announced Rock's follow-up to 2011's Follow Me Home would finally be released in 2015.
 On August 4, 2015, Jay Rock revealed the title of his long-awaited and often-delayed second studio album to be 90059. The album's title comes from the zip code of Watts, Los Angeles, California, the area in which Jay Rock was raised.

Recording and production
Upon releasing his debut effort Follow Me Home in 2011, Jay Rock spoke on his second studio album in August 2012 and explained that he's going to take a new sonic direction with his next LP: "[I'm] just working on my album…[it's coming] real soon. I'm in the process of working on it right now, nahmean?", he said. "Basically, I've been working with my same producers, nahmean? In-house. I've been working with upcoming producers, too, just trying to come with a whole new sound. I just dropped a new track recently; the whole Internet, they went crazy over it this week. I'm basically just re-building, that's all I'm doing, coming with something new." On August 17, 2015, it was revealed New York rapper Busta Rhymes would make an appearance on the album, on a track titled "Fly on the Wall", where he praises Jay Rock. It was also announced 90059 would feature a Black Hippy posse cut, the first time since 2012.

Release and promotion
In September 2014, in an interview with XXL, Jay Rock blamed business and politics for his lack of music over the years. On October 27, 2014, Jay Rock released a song titled "Pay for It", as a promotional single. On November 15, 2014, Jay Rock performed "Pay For It" on the NBC late-night live television sketch comedy and variety show, Saturday Night Live, alongside Kendrick Lamar and Chantal. On June 2, 2015, Rock released the first single, titled "Money Trees Deuce". The song is a sequel to Kendrick Lamar's song, "Money Trees", in which Jay Rock was featured and highly praised. On July 1, 2015, a second single, titled "Gumbo", was released. On August 4, 2015, Jay Rock announced the album would be titled 90059 and released the title-track as the album's third single. On August 15, 2015, Rock unveiled the album's cover art, as well as the track-listing. On September 4, 2015, Jay Rock announced that the album would finally be released on September 11, 2015.

The release date for 90059 was determined to be parted by the number of pre-orders of the album, which indicated the demand was strong enough to warrant a release.

Critical reception

Upon release, 90059 was met with positive critical reception from critics, with critics praising the story telling, dynamics of the album and the experimental production. Praise was also included for the guest features such as Jay Rock's label mates, Kendrick Lamar, Ab-Soul, ScHoolboy Q, SZA and Isaiah Rashad. At Metacritic, which assigns a normalized rating out of 100 to reviews from critics, 90059 received an average score of 79, which indicates "generally favorable reviews", based on 7 reviews.

Accolades

Commercial performance
The album debuted at number 16 on the US Billboard 200, selling 18,713 album-equivalent units in its first week. The album also debuted at number two on the US Top R&B/Hip-Hop Albums chart.

Track listing

Charts

Weekly charts

Year-end charts

Release history

References

2015 albums
Jay Rock albums
Top Dawg Entertainment albums
Albums produced by Cardo
Albums produced by Sounwave
Albums produced by Tae Beast